is a Japanese track and field sprinter. His personal best is 10.22 seconds in the 100 metres and 6.54 seconds in the indoor 60 metres. The latter is the current Japanese indoor record. He won a silver medal in the 4 × 100 metres relay at the 2014 World Junior Championships, with teammates Yoshihide Kiryu, Yuki Koike and Masaharu Mori.

Personal bests

International competition

National titles

References

External links

1995 births
Living people
Sportspeople from Chiba Prefecture
Japanese male sprinters
21st-century Japanese people